Petta is a 2019 Indian Tamil-language action drama film written and directed by Karthik Subbaraj. The film was produced by Kalanithi Maran under the banner Sun Pictures. The film stars Rajinikanth alongside an ensemble cast featuring Vijay Sethupathi, Nawazuddin Siddiqui, M. Sasikumar, Simran, Trisha, Megha Akash, Malavika Mohanan, Mahendran, Bobby Simha, Guru Somasundaram, Aadukalam Naren, Munishkanth, and Sananth in supporting roles. The music was composed by Anirudh Ravichander with editing done by Vivek Harshan and cinematography by Tirru. In the film Kaali, a hostel warden crosses paths with a group of criminals where things takes an interesting turn.

The film was released on 10 January 2019. The film received positive reviews from critics, who appreciated the cast performances (particularly Rajnikanth, Vijay Sethupathi and Nawazuddin Siddiqui), cinematography, soundtrack & musical score and direction, but criticized the film's length.

Plot 
Kaali is a mysterious and deceivingly elderly man, who takes up the job of a boys' hostel warden at a college in Ooty. He notices that the hostel is dominated by a group of unruly final-year students, who are led by Michael, the spoiled son of a local leader named Gnanam. Kaali puts a stop to Michael's antics, which leads to enmity between the two. Kaali also forms a close bond with a NRI hostelite named Anwar, who is in a relationship with Anu, the daughter of Mangalam, a pranic healer.

Kaali convinces Mangalam to accept her daughter's relationship with Anwar, and they end up falling in love. Michael, who lusts for Anu, is angered on hearing of her relationship with Anwar, and attempts to harass them, only to be stopped by Kaali. Michael and his friends are suspended, where Anwar records and shares the humiliation of Michael and his gang. The video is noticed in Uttar Pradesh by a local goon named Jithu, the son of a powerful politician called Singaaram aka Singaar Singh. Singaar, on seeing Anwar in the video as well as in a photo with his mother on Facebook, sends his men to Ooty to kill Anwar, for unknown reasons.

At the same time, Michael, humiliated at his suspension, sends his men to beat up (but not kill) Kaali. Michael's plan backfires as he and his men are caught in the fight between Kaali and Singaar's men. Kaali subdues Singaar's men, earning Michael's and Gnanam's respect, following which Anwar meets Kaali's friend, who narrates about his past. Anwar is the son of Maalik, who was Kaali's best friend. It is also revealed that Kaali's real name is Petta Velan, who is a well-respected man in his village in Madurai.

Past: Maalik learns that Devaram and Singaar were involved in illegal sand mafia, which leads to Devaram getting arrested by Maalik and Petta. Petta learns that Maalik was in love with Devaram and Singaar's sister Poongodi, who conceived with him out of wedlock. Though relucant, Petta finally agrees, where he and his wife Saraswathy "Saro" managed to convince Poongodi's father Rajapandi to get Poongodi married to Maalik, but Devaram and Singaar vehemently opposed the alliance as well as the transfer of property to Poongodi. After Maalik and Poongodi's marriage, Devaram and Singaar kill Rajapandi.

On hearing about Rajapandi's murder, Petta kills Devaram during Rajapandi's funeral and chased Singaar out of the village. Enraged about Devaram's death and his forced exile, Singaar orchestrates a bomb blast during Poongodi's seemantham, killing Maalik, Saro and Petta's son Chinna. After finding that Poongodi is still alive, Petta took her to safety. Poongodi later gave birth to a boy, who is revealed to be Anwar and both of them left for Australia as refugees to escape from Singaar.

Present: On learning his past, Anwar, along with Petta and Michael's henchmen leave for Uttar Pradesh to finish off Singaar once and for all. Petta and Anwar confront Jithu, who is determined to kill them both after learning about them from his father. The duo manages to escape Jithu. Later, Petta meets Jithu privately and reveals to him that he is none other than his son Chinna, who did not die in the blast, but was adopted by Singaar after finding him still alive in the wreckage. When Jithu confronts Singaar regarding his parentage, the latter sends his men to kill him, who is rescued by Petta.

Along with Anwar and Michael's henchmen, Petta and Jithu ambush Singaar's mansion where they decimate his guards and Petta confronts and guns Singaar down. Following Singaar's death, Petta reveals that Jithu is not his son and that he really is Singaar's son. Petta used him to lead to Singaar as part of a strategy to kill the latter. He further adds that Chinna had died in the bomb blast. After this shocking revelation, Petta holds Jithu at gunpoint and kills him.

Cast

Production

Pre-production 
In early February 2018, after completing his filming commitments for Pa. Ranjith's Kaala (2018), Rajinikanth held final discussions with a group of young directors, including Arun Prabu Purushothaman, Atlee, and Karthik Subbaraj for his next project. On 23 February 2018, production house Sun Pictures announced that they would produce a film starring Rajinikanth to be directed by Karthik Subbaraj. To accommodate the film's shoot throughout the course of 2018, the director postponed the pre-production work of another proposed film starring Dhanush for YNOT Studios. Subbaraj revealed that he was confident about approaching Rajinikanth to work on his film, after the actor was impressed with his earlier project, Jigarthanda (2014) and expressed a desire to collaborate. The pair had first discussed the script in early 2017, but Rajinikanth did not take a final call until finishing his existing filming commitments to Kaala and 2.0 (2018). Talking about the project, Subbaraj initially revealed that the film would be an "action drama" which was "fictional" but "realistic".

Development 
Anirudh Ravichander was signed on to work as the film's music composer in early March 2018, in a move which saw him collaborate with his maternal uncle Rajinikanth, and Subbaraj, for the first time. Tirru and Vivek Harshan were selected to be the film's cinematographer and editor respectively, continuing their collaboration with Subbaraj following their work in Mercury (2018). Likewise, stunt choreographer Peter Hein also joined the team thereafter. In late May 2018, Subbaraj and Tirru went on a recce to scout locations in Nepal and North India to shoot the film. The film's title Petta was revealed on 7 September 2018.

Casting 
Vijay Sethupathi was signed on to play a character in April 2018, and accordingly reworked his dates to fit the film into his busy schedule. The actor signed the film after a month of media speculation that he would portray a villainous role, and revealed that he signed the film as he had blind trust in Subbaraj, and initially did not request to listen to the script. Subbaraj had also been keen to sign Fahadh Faasil for a role in the film, but the actor's filming commitments for Varathan (2018) meant that he could not allot dates. Hindi film actor Nawazuddin Siddiqui joined the cast in July 2018, while two other regular collaborators of Subbaraj, actors Bobby Simha and Sananth, were also signed to play pivotal roles in the film. Other members of the cast included supporting actors Guru Somasundaram, Ramdoss, Shabeer Kallarakkal, Deepak Paramesh, Adithya Shivpink, and Manikandan R. Achari.

For leading female roles, the team held discussions throughout March 2018 with actresses Trisha, Deepika Padukone, and Anjali, but neither were signed immediately. In July 2018, the producers announced that Simran had joined the cast to play as pair of Rajinikanth. Trisha was eventually added to the cast in August 2018, while Malavika Mohanan was also signed to appear alongside Rajinikanth. Megha Akash was cast as Sananth's pair, and joined the shoot before the release of any of her initial Tamil films, Boomerang, Enai Noki Paayum Thota and Oru Pakka Kathai. In October, M. Sasikumar and Mahendran joined the cast.

Filming 
Principal photography began in June 2018. The first schedule of the shoot began on 7 June at Eastern Forest Rangers College at St. Mary's Hill, Kurseong in Darjeeling, with the initial portions lasting nine days. The team then shot in other location across Darjeeling and the hill towns for a further month, in locations including St. Paul's and Mount Hermon School. To finish the first schedule, the team returned to Kurseong for six days. An audition to cast 150 local actors was also held in Charbagh, Lucknow during the first schedule. During the making of the schedule, Rajinikanth met with politician Gautam Deb, who helped the makers have a hassle free shoot in exchange for the promotion of tourism in the area. Principal photography wrapped in October 2018, fifteen days ahead of schedule.

Music 

The soundtrack album and background score is composed by Anirudh Ravichander, marking his first collaboration with Rajinikanth and Karthik Subbaraj. The lyrics were penned by Vivek, Ku. Karthik, Dhanush and Karthik Subbaraj. The audio launch took place on 9 December 2018, at Sai Leo Muthu Auditorium, Sri Sai Ram Engineering College, Chennai. The album consists of all eleven songs, which 5 of them are theme songs. The first single track, "Marana Mass" was released on 3 December 2018, followed by "Ullallaa" which released on 7 December 2018. The full album was made available for digital download on 9 December 2018, under the Sony Music record label, which had acquired the audio rights of the film. In February 2019, the album crossed 250 million streams on all platforms.

Release

Theatrical 
Petta was released on 10 January 2019, coinciding with the occasion of Thai Pongal festival along with Ajith Kumar starrer Viswasam.

Home media 
Petta is available for streaming in Sun NXT and Netflix and on Voot. The satellite rights of the film is sold to Sun TV.

Reception

Box office 
Petta was released on 600 screens in Tamil Nadu with tough competition from Viswasam. The film grossed ₹1.12 crore at the Chennai box office. The film also grossed $133K at the US, overtaking Viswasam which grossed  $18K. On its opening day, the film grossed ₹36.6 crore worldwide, with a share of ₹19 crore worldwide. The film collected ₹104 crore, in 3 days and grossed more than ₹138 crore in the opening weekend. The film collected  worldwide on 4 days. The film collected ₹200 crore within 23 days.

Critical response 
The film received positive reviews from critics. 

M. Suganth from The Times of India, rated 3.5 out of 5, stating that "Petta is less of a Karthik Subbaraj film, but it gives Rajini fans their Thalaivar in a way that they have been dying to see him, celebrating the Rajinisms." Filmibeat rated the film 3.5 out of 5, stating "Petta is definitely a film that stays loyal to its genre and it keeps the audiences entertained despite some of the dragging moments in the second half. It is indeed a treat for all Rajinikanth fans as the superstar steals the show in a way that only he can." Srinivasa Ramanujam of The Hindu stated that "Despite quite a few underwritten characters, Petta triumphs by bringing back the Superstar of yore!" Indiaglitz rated the film 3.75 out of 5, stating that "Go for this kickass true blue Thalaivar movie in which Karthik Subbaraj Rajinifies you." Sify rated the film 3 out of 5. India Today rated the film 3.5 out of 5 stars, and summarised that "Petta is a classic Rajinikanth film that his fans should not miss". Anusha Iyengar from the Times Now rated 3.5 out of 5, with a verdict "Petta is a complete mass entertainer with twists and turns that will make you howl in the theatres like you would in a Thalaiva film. It is relevant to the current day and age; it's a film that all Rajinikanth fans will definitely enjoy!"  Behindwoods rated the film 3 out of 5, stating that "Style! Mass! Style! Petta is a celebration of Superstar Rajinikanth. Go enjoy it." The Indian Express rated 3.5 out of 5 stars, reviewing that "Karthik Subbaraj has a sense of style, which breaks through only occasionally in Petta. For that Rajini Sir will have to submit a little more to the script, and a last little twist in the long drawn-out climax holds out hope. "NDTV rated the film 2.5 out of 5, and summarised that "Rajinikanth returns to the basics with aplomb. Just go and watch it for the Rajinikanth that you missed in his last few releases." Baradwaj Rangan, rated the film 2.5 out of 5 stars, stating "Jigarthanda and Iraivi were sprawling stories but there was a sense of a gradual buildup, the sense of the narrative noose being slowly tightened. But Petta looks rushed and even the Karthik Subbaraj flourishes come off like affectations"  Gauthaman Baskaran, from News18 rated 1 out of 5 stating that, "Petta turns out be yet another outing for Rajinikanth who relies on gimmicks rather than solid performance." Ananda Vikatan rated the film 41 out of 100.

Legacy
The introduction scene of Petta Velan has been parodied by Yogi Babu for the film Pei Mama (2021).

References

External links 
 
 

2019 films
2010s Tamil-language films
2019 action drama films
Films scored by Anirudh Ravichander
Indian action drama films
2019 masala films
Films shot in West Bengal
Films shot in Lucknow
Films set in Madurai
Films shot in Darjeeling
Films directed by Karthik Subbaraj
Sun Pictures films